Krasilovo is a rural locality (a village) in Gorkinskoye Rural Settlement, Kirzhachsky District, Vladimir Oblast, Russia. The population was 2 as of 2010. There are 4 streets.

Geography 
Krasilovo is located on the Sherna River, 12 km northwest of Kirzhach (the district's administrative centre) by road. Yeltsy is the nearest rural locality.

References 

Rural localities in Kirzhachsky District